The sixth season of Psych, consisting of 16 episodes, premiered on the USA Network in the United States on October 12, 2011 and continued to air until April 11, 2012.  James Roday, Dulé Hill, Timothy Omundson, Maggie Lawson, Corbin Bernsen and Kirsten Nelson all reprised their roles as the main characters.

Production
Steve Franks continued to act as showrunner of the series.  The song "I Know, You Know," performed by The Friendly Indians, was used once again as the show's theme song, though it was edited three times for theme episodes: "The Amazing Psych-Man & Tap Man, Issue #2" utilized a comic book-style theme song and title sequence. A classic jazz variation was used in "Heeeeere's Lassie" while the theme used in the season four episode "High Top Fade Out" was used once more in  "Let's Doo-Wop It Again."

Mel Damski returned to the series once again to direct three episodes, while Steve Franks and James Roday directed two each.  John Badham, Andy Berman, Andrew Bernstein, Jay Chandrasekhar, David Crabtree, and Reginald Hudlin directed one episode each, while Timothy Busfield, Jennifer Lynch, and Brad Turner made their Psych directorial debuts in one episode each.  Andy Berman, Todd Harthan, and Saladin K. Patterson wrote three episodes for the season.  Kell Cahoon, Bill Callahan, Steve Franks, Tim Meltreger, and James Roday returned to the writing staff to pen two episodes each.  Carlos Jacott joined the series to write one episode.

The season contained Indiana Jones, "Bull Durham", and Chinatown tributes, along with a Shining-themed episode.  Series star Dulé Hill discussed the possibility of having another Twin Peaks themed episode, which would be a sequel to the season 5 episode "Dual Spires."  A musical episode was also planned, but was later confirmed to be on hold until the seventh season.  Another theme episode revolving around the film Clue was also announced, but was later pushed back to the seventh season as well.  Production for the season began in late March, 2011.

Cast

James Roday continued in his tenure as the fake psychic detective Shawn Spencer.  Dulé Hill continued to portray Burton "Gus" Guster.  Timothy Omundson and Maggie Lawson appeared as detectives Carlton "Lassie" Lassiter and Juliet "Jules" O'Hara, respectively.  Corbin Bernsen portrayed Henry Spencer, and Kirsten Nelson returned as SBPD Chief Karen Vick.

Sage Brocklebank made further appearances as Buzz McNab.  Kurt Fuller returned in many episodes as Woody the Coroner, while Skyler Gisondo and Carlos McCullers II returned as young Shawn and Gus in flashbacks.  Cary Elwes returned as Despereaux for an Indiana Jones-themed episode.  Jaleel White returned as Gus's former bandmate, Tony.  Kenan Thompson was expected to return as Joon, another bandmate, but he did not appear; this disappearance was referenced in "Let's Doo-Wop It Again."  Kristy Swanson appeared as Marlowe Viccellio, a mysterious woman who catches Lassiter's eye; she reprised her role in a later episode. Max Gail made his first appearance as Jerry Carp, one of Henry's cop friends. Carlos Jacott returned to the series, but appeared in a different role than in his season one appearance. William Shatner appeared as Juliet's father Frank in two episodes.  Other guest stars for the season include Mädchen Amick, Anthony Anderson, Diedrich Bader, Diora Baird, Rob Benedict, Wade Boggs, Wayne Brady, Lolita Davidovich, Brad Dourif, Rob Estes, Corey Feldman, Jennifer Finnigan, Miles Fisher, Patrick Gallagher, Danny Glover, Louis Gossett Jr., Greg Grunberg, Julianna Guill, Tony Hale, Van Hansis, Glenne Headly, Whit Hertford, Jeff Hiller, Stoney Jackson, Matt Kaminsky, Suzanne Krull, Liza Lapira, Tom Lenk, Jocelyne Loewen, Ed Lover, Jessica Lucas, Cheech Marin, Malcolm McDowell, Joey McIntyre, Kate Micucci, Ivana Miličević, The Miz, Lochlyn Munro, Arden Myrin, Mekhi Phifer, Jason Priestley, John Rhys-Davies, Derek Richardson, Molly Ringwald, Sara Rue, Amanda Schull, Lindsay Sloane, French Stewart, Michael Trucco, Marc Evan Jackson, and Polly Walker.

Episodes

DVD release
All 16 episodes of the sixth season of Psych were released on DVD on October 16, 2012. The four-disc set is presented in anamorphic widescreen format, English Dolby Digital 5.1 surround sound, and with English subtitles. The bonus features of the set include: two extended episodes; deleted and extended scenes; a gag reel; 16 video commentaries featuring creator/writer/executive producer Steve Franks, writers Saladin K. Patterson, Bill Callahan, Andy Berman, Tim Meltreger, Kell Cahoon and Todd Harthan as well as writer/actor James Roday; episode-specific commentaries for "Shawn Rescues Darth Vader", "Last Night Gus", "This Episode Sucks", "In for a Penny...", "Neil Simon's Lover's Retreat", "Indiana Shawn and the Temple of the Kinda Crappy, Rusty Old Dagger", "Heeeeere's Lassie", and "Santabarbaratown"; and three featurettes: "Underground With Psych", "Psychouts", and "Montages". The entire running time for the set is 11 hours, 40 minutes.

References

Psych
2011 American television seasons
2012 American television seasons